Airaines is a commune in the Somme department in Hauts-de-France in northern France.

Geography

Hamlets and neighbourhoods
 
 Dourier : Originally a hamlet to the northeast of the town, now a suburb.
 Dreuil-Hamel : Stretching out to the west, sprinkled with orchards and meadows, this commune was once separate. By decree of 26 September 1972 it was joined with Airaines in a simple merger.

Population

History
 In earlier times, the town flourished, due mainly to the importance of the castle of the dukes of Luynes.
 During World War II, the town was subject to much destruction in June 1940. The Market hall was destroyed.
 The years 1985-2000 saw the closure of several important economical activities, resulting in high unemployment

Places and monuments
 Saint-Denis church
 The Priory (Notre Dame church)
 Dreuil-Hamel church, abandoned and in danger of collapsing
 The towers of the dukes of Luynes
 The memorial to Charles N'Tchoréré
 A monument aux morts with sculptural work by Albert Dominique Roze

People
Charles N'Tchoréré (15 November 1896 - 1940) was a Gabonese military commander who was shot by the Germans in World War II during the battle for France.

Twin towns
   Kriftel, Germany

See also
Communes of the Somme department
War memorials (Western Somme)

References

External links

(All French language)
 The Priory website
 Official municipal website

Communes of Somme (department)
Picardy